The Orchestre philharmonique de Paris (1935-1938) was the name of an orchestra directed by Charles Münch, and of a third orchestra (1958-mid 1960s) directed by Léon Barzin. In 1950, a second Orchestre philharmonique de Paris (or orchestre de la Société philharmonique de Paris), notably directed by Jules Gressier and René Leibowitz,  made a large number of gramophone recordings for the labels Classic and Le Chant du Monde.

References

1935 establishments in France
1960s disestablishments in France
French orchestras
Disbanded orchestras
Musical groups from Paris
Musical groups established in 1935
Musical groups disestablished in the 1960s